Victor Martins (born 16 June 2001) is a French-Portuguese racing driver and member of the Alpine Academy, currently competing in the 2023 FIA Formula 2 Championship with ART Grand Prix. He won the 2020 Formula Renault Eurocup and the 2022 FIA Formula 3 Championship.

Career

Karting 
Born in Quincy-sous-Sénart to a French mother and a Portuguese father, Martins began karting in 2014 after a spell in gymnastics in which he became French gymnastics champion at the age of 10. In 2016, he went on to win the CIK-FIA World Championship title in dominant fashion, leading pundits to liken Martins to Stoffel Vandoorne. In December 2016, Motorsport.com listed Martins as one of the ten karting drivers to look out for, ranking him second to Logan Sargeant. Throughout his karting career, Martins won many other major competitions.

Formula 4

2016 
Whilst karting in 2016, Martins partook as a guest driver in the fifth round of the French F4 Championship, in which he claimed two podiums.

2017 
Martins stepped up to single-seaters in 2017, returning to contest the French F4 Championship full-time. Martins won twice during the first weekend, and won another in the next round, despite having a further win beign excluded due to collision. His fourth and final win came at the very final race, which was enough to be crowned junior champion and overall vice-champion. He claimed nine poles, ten fastest laps and eleven podiums in total.

Formula Renault

2018 

After driving for them during post-season testing, Martins signed to race with the R-ace GP outfit for the 2018 Formula Renault Eurocup. Martins took his first Eurocup win during the midpoint of the season at the Red Bull Ring, and later another at Spa-Francorchamps. Overall, he claimed two pole positions and six podiums, which placed him fifth in the overall standings. Martins also contested the NEC championship, claiming his maiden Formula Renault victory at Monza. Following the third round however, Martins was inellgible for points, which ranked him sixth.

2019 
Martins returned for the 2019 championship, switching to MP Motorsport, which had carried Martins' fellow Renault junior Christian Lundgaard to second in the championship the previous year. Before the season, he participated in the final round of the 2019 Asian F3 Winter Series. Martins had an average start to the first half of the season, scoring only one win but was level with leader Oscar Piastri at the halfway mark. Martins recorded five wins in the last four rounds and finished runner-up to Piastri, with 7.5 points splitting the pair at the end of the year. Martins won six races, achieving 14 podiums throughout the year, three more than rival Piastri. In an article by Motorsport.com, Martins was ranked ninth of the top 20 junior single-seater drivers of 2019.

2020 
Martins moved to ART Grand Prix for the 2020 season of the championship, partnering Grégoire Saucy and rookie Paul Aron. Martins took his first two victories during the Nürburgring round, hauling himself into title contention. There would be more success to come, with four wins coming from the next six races. Martins won one more race in Imola. In a hard-fought battle with Brazilian Caio Collet Martins came out on top, after a total of seven victories and a nine race long podium streak during the middle of the season, ending up 44 points ahead of Collet.

FIA Formula 3 Championship

2021: Top rookie 

In October 2020, Martins joined ART Grand Prix for the post-season test at Catalunya, which saw him finish in the top ten across all four sessions, with a highest placed finish of fifth on the first day. He ended up signing for MP Motorsport for the 2021 Formula 3 season, alongside fellow Alpine junior and Formula Renault Eurocup title rival Caio Collet and Tijmen van der Helm. The Frenchman's season started out positively, qualifying third in the opening round. He took his first podium in second place in Race 2 after a last-lap battle with Olli Caldwell. In Race 3, Martins moved up to second at the start but eventually slipped to fifth. Martins qualified third again in his home race in Le Castellet, and pushed himself into the lead of the race by lap 18, but was passed by Alexander Smolyar with just half a lap to go. A second podium came in Race 2 where Martins again charged through the field, finishing third. Martins concluded his podium-laden weekend with a fourth place in Race 3. At the first race in Austria, Martins finished fifth, a post-race penalty depriving him of a podium. A disappointing end to Race 2 followed, Martins lost power on the penultimate lap that saw him retire from second place, and tyre damage with Arthur Leclerc saw him end Race 3 with no points. The Frenchman had a disastrous Budapest round, a poor qualifying was rewarded with zero points in all races.

The no points streak ended at Spa-Francorchamps, where Martins qualified second and scored fifth place in Race 1. In Race 3, Martins battled with Jack Doohan for the feature race victory, eventually having to settle for second as the Frenchman overtook Doohan off-track, being forced to give the lead back. In Zandvoort, Martins continued his qualifying success, securing third. After a decent Race 1, Martins climbed up to the lead in Race 2, and duly took his first win in the series. Late in the race during Race 3, Martins made a failed move on David Schumacher for second place, sending the German driver into the barriers. Martins was handed a ten-second penalty and was dropped to tenth place. Martins qualified 12th for reverse pole during the Sochi finale. He would lose the lead early on to Logan Sargeant, and then lost another position to claim third place. In the last race, Martins concluded his season in eighth place. Martins finished fifth in the drivers' standings with 131 points, scoring one win, five more podiums and four fastest laps, also becoming the best-placed rookie of the season.

2022: Championship season 

He tested for ART Grand Prix during the post-season testing and the following year, was announced in their line-up for the 2022 campaign. In the opening Bahrain round, Martins had a disappointing start, colliding with teammate Grégoire Saucy, and Martins received a puncture which caused his retirement in the sprint race. Martins took his first win of the season by winning the feature race over Arthur Leclerc, also having to overtake leader Franco Colapinto mid-race. In Imola Martins qualified sixth. In the sprint race, after a great start, Martins took advantage of a last-lap collision to finish second. During the feature race on a drying track, after starting on the wet tyre, Martins was forced to pit but managed to charge to ninth. At Barcelona, Martins qualified on the front row. Martins would suffer a mechanical failure that led to a retirement on Saturday, but during the feature race Martins would overtake polesitter Roman Staněk at the start and control the race for his third win overall.

Martins qualified 11th in Silverstone. From second, he would pass reverse polesitter Reece Ushijima but on the penultimate lap, fell back to second when Isack Hadjar passed him from the lead of the sprint race. In the feature race, Martins finished in seventh place, overtaking Jonny Edgar on the final lap. Martins qualified second at the Red Bull Ring. After achieving two points in the sprint race, he secured another second place in the feature race. In Hungary, he scored sixth and tenth place in the sprint and feature races, in the latter race dropping two positions late in the race.

After the summer break however, Martins experienced a shocking weekend in Belgium, qualifying lowly in 24th thanks to an error on his final flying lap during a mixed-weather session. A jump start in the sprint race before being taken out of the feature race by Kush Maini summed up the disastrous weekend, and also lost the standings lead. He came back fighting in Zandvoort, once again missing out on pole and settling for second. A great start saw him jump four places in the sprint race, and finished seventh. In the feature race, he snatched the lead from Zane Maloney at the start, but lost out to him at the halfway mark. His second placed feature race podium put himself into the lead of the championship with one round remaining.

Before the Monza finale, Martins stated that he "[didn't] want to think, [he] just [wanted] to do". Martins qualified fourth, but in the sprint race he tumbled down the order at the start after making contact with Leclerc. However, he climbed back to tenth place. The feature race ended in under dramatic circumstances due to a crash, with Martins receiving a five-second post-race penalty due to track limits. He took advantage of numerous penalties for other rivals, which demoted Martins only to P4, thus securing the championship victory and also becoming the first drivers' champion for a team other than Prema in the category. His closest title rival Zane Maloney, who finished a mere five points behind the Frenchman, commented after Martins' title had been confirmed that there was "no one better to win the championship". Overall, Martins achieved two wins, four podiums and 139 points.

FIA Formula 2 Championship 
At the conclusion of the 2022 F2 season, Martins drove for ART Grand Prix during the post-season test at the Yas Marina Circuit. In January 2023, Martins was announced to be stepping up to Formula 2 with ART alongside fellow Frenchman Théo Pourchaire.

Formula One 
In January 2018, Martins was inducted into the Renault Sport Academy. After the 2019 season the French driver was released from the program. Martins rejoined the newly formed Alpine F1 Team academy on the 10th of February after his Formula Renault Eurocup title win.

Karting record

Karting career summary

Complete CIK-FIA Karting European Championship results 
(key) (Races in bold indicate pole position) (Races in italics indicate fastest lap)

Racing record

Career summary 

† As Martins was a guest driver, he was ineligible for points.
‡ Martins was ineligible for points from the third round onwards.

Complete French F4 Championship results 
(key) (Races in bold indicate pole position) (Races in italics indicate fastest lap)

† As Martins was a guest driver, he was ineligible for points.

Complete Formula Renault Eurocup results 
(key) (Races in bold indicate pole position) (Races in italics indicate fastest lap)

‡ Half points awarded as less than 75% of race distance was completed.

Complete FIA Formula 3 Championship results 
(key) (Races in bold indicate pole position; races in italics indicate points for the fastest lap of top ten finishers)

† Driver did not finish the race, but was classified as they completed more than 90% of the race distance.

Complete FIA Formula 2 Championship results 
(key) (Races in bold indicate pole position) (Races in italics indicate points for the fastest lap of top ten finishers)

References

External links 
 
 

2001 births
Living people
French racing drivers
French F4 Championship drivers
Sportspeople from Essonne
Formula Renault Eurocup drivers
FIA Formula 3 Championship drivers
Auto Sport Academy drivers
R-ace GP drivers
MP Motorsport drivers
ART Grand Prix drivers
F3 Asian Championship drivers
Pinnacle Motorsport drivers
Karting World Championship drivers
FIA Formula 3 Champions
FIA Formula 2 Championship drivers
French people of Portuguese descent